= Model year (computer modeling) =

Simulated length of a year

Model year in computer modeling is a unit of simulated time representing one calendar year within a computer model or simulation. The term is commonly used in fields such as climate modeling, hydrology, economics, and risk modeling, where a simulation may represent many years of real-world processes. A computer may calculate numerous model years in a short period of actual time, allowing researchers to study long-term system behavior and future scenarios more efficiently than would be possible through direct observation.

== Applications ==
Model years are used in a variety of scientific and analytical fields. Climate models may simulate hundreds of model years to study long-term climate change, while hydrological, ecological, and economic models use model years to analyze trends, forecast future conditions, and evaluate the effects of different scenarios or policies.

== Computational performance ==
The rate at which a computer processes model years depends on the design of the model and the available hardware. Modern supercomputers can calculate multiple model years per day for complex climate simulations, while simpler models may simulate many years within seconds. Because simulated time is independent of real-world time, a model may calculate long periods of future or past conditions much faster than they occur in reality.
